Albert Kahn may refer to:
Albert Kahn (architect) (1869–1942), American architect
Albert Kahn (banker) (1860–1940), French banker, philanthropist and photograph collector
Albert E. Kahn (1912–1979), American journalist

See also
 Alfred Kahn (disambiguation)